General Joseph Wood Ralston (born November 4, 1943) is currently the United States Special Envoy for countering the Kurdistan Workers Party (PKK) and holds senior positions in various defense related corporations. He was previously a career officer in the United States Air Force, and served as the fourth vice chairman of the Joint Chiefs of Staff (1996–2000) as well as Supreme Allied Commander for the North Atlantic Treaty Organization (NATO) in Europe (2000–2003).

Career

Military career

Ralston served in the United States Air Force (USAF) from 1965 to 2003. He served in operational command at squadron, wing, numbered air force and major command, as well as various staff and management positions at every level of the USAF.

Ralston became Vice Chairman of the Joint Chiefs of Staff in 1996. He was favored to become Chairman of the Joint Chiefs of Staff in 1997. Following revelations of an extra-marital affair with a civilian employee of the Central Intelligence Agency in the 1980s, he remained vice chairman until May 2000 when he was appointed Supreme Allied Commander Europe for the North Atlantic Treaty Organization (NATO) in Europe. He retired in March 2003 and joined the Board of Trustees of the Center for Strategic and International Studies.

Former U.S. president Bill Clinton writes in his memoirs My Life that Ralston was used to resolve a potentially sticky situation with Pakistan in which the U.S. would use Pakistani airspace to strike at the Al-Qaeda organization meeting in Afghanistan following the U.S. Embassy bombings in Kenya and Tanzania. There was U.S. concern that Pakistan's intelligence services would tip off the targets or even worse assume the missiles over Pakistan came from India, potentially triggering a nuclear conflict on the Indian subcontinent. As Clinton writes on page 799 of My Life, "we decided to send the vice chairman of the Joint Chiefs of Staff, General Joe Ralston, to have dinner with the top Pakistani military commander at the time the attacks were scheduled. Ralston would tell him (the Pakistani general) what was happening a few minutes before our missiles invaded Pakistani airspace, too late to alert the Taliban or Al-Qaeda, but in time to avoid having them shot down or sparking a counterattack on India."

In September 2006, Ralston was assigned as Special Envoy for Countering the Kurdistan Workers Party (PKK) by U.S. president George W. Bush.  The PKK is a Kurdish armed militant group designated as a terrorist organization by the United States, Turkey and the European Union.

Ralston was one of at least three retired four-star generals asked by the Bush administration to oversee both wars in Iraq and Afghanistan. Ralston and the two other generals, however, all declined this position.

Corporate career
Ralston is director of the Timken Company and the URS Corporation, is on the Board of Directors of Lockheed Martin and has been Vice Chairman of the Cohen Group, since March 2003. He also sits on the advisory board of the American Turkish Council, an American-Turkish lobby group.

Controversies

Accusation of moral double-standard
In 1997, Ralston was the top candidate to succeed John M. Shalikashvili as Chairman of the Joint Chiefs of Staff in 1997 when it became public that Ralston had an extramarital affair with a married civilian CIA employee during the 1980s. Ralston said he and his wife were separated at the time while his wife said that the affair continued afterwards and led to their divorce. Defense Secretary William Cohen declared that Ralston's relationship 13 years ago would not "automatically disqualify" him from becoming the Chairman of the Joint Chiefs of Staff, resulting in accusations of a double standard for high-ranking military officers while lower ranks were punished. A month earlier, the first female B-52 pilot, First Lieutenant Kelly Flinn, had been forced to resign from the Air Force with a general discharge after having been charged with adultery. Ralston eventually withdrew his name from consideration.

Alleged conflicts of interest
Ralston held various senior positions in defense and security-related corporations, simultaneously with his diplomatic role as "anti PKK coordinator". Critics said Ralston was using his influence as special envoy to secure large government weapons contracts for arms maker Lockheed Martin where he was on the board of directors. Besides, he was also on the advisory board of the American Turkish Council (ATC). The Boston Globe described him as "an arms merchant in diplomat's clothing."

In October 2006, the Kurdish National Congress of North America issued a press release demanding "the immediate resignation" of General Joseph Ralston:

Since the PKK insurgency began in 1983, 30,000 people have died and over 3,000 Kurdish villages have been destroyed, often by U.S. supplied planes. Critics are concerned that hard line anti-PKK policies influenced by conflicting interests would compromise the prospects for longterm solution to the Kurdish-Turkish issue.

On October 1, 2006, the PKK announced a unilateral cease-fire in south-east Turkey, a move that the Turkish government has  rejected:

Speaking before the Eurasian Strategic Research Center (ASAM) in Istanbul, Ralston mirrored the Turkish government's rhetoric :

Education

Military career summary

Assignments
 July 1965 – August 1966, student, pilot training, Laughlin Air Force Base, Texas
 August 1966 – April 1967, student, F-105 Thunderchief combat crew training school, Nellis Air Force Base, Nevada
 April 1967 – October 1969, F-105 combat crew member, 67th Tactical Fighter Squadron, later 12th Tactical Fighter Squadron, Kadena Air Base, Japan
 October 1969 – December 1969, student, F-105 Wild Weasel pilot training, Nellis Air Force Base, Nevada
 January 1970 – October 1970, F-105 Wild Weasel pilot, 354th Tactical Fighter Squadron, Takhli Royal Thai Air Force Base, Thailand
 October 1970 – December 1971, F-105 Wild Weasel instructor pilot, 66th Fighter Weapons Squadron, Nellis Air Force Base, Nevada
 December 1971 – June 1973, Fighter Requirements Officer and Project Officer for F-15 and Lightweight Fighter programs, Office of the Deputy Chief of Staff for Requirements, Headquarters Tactical Air Command, Langley Air Force Base, Virginia
 June 1973 – June 1975, Assistant Operations Officer, 335th Tactical Fighter Squadron, then Chief, Standardization and Evaluation Division, 4th Tactical Fighter Wing, Seymour Johnson Air Force Base, North Carolina
 June 1975 – June 1976, student, United States Army Command and General Staff College, Fort Leavenworth, Kansas
 June 1976 – July 1979, Tactical Fighter Requirements Officer, Office of the Deputy Chief of Staff for Research and Development, Headquarters U.S. Air Force, Washington, D.C.
 July 1979 – July 1980, Operations Officer, later, Commander, 68th Tactical Fighter Squadron, Moody Air Force Base, Georgia
 July 1980 – August 1983, Special Assistant, later, Executive Officer to the commander, Headquarters Tactical Air Command, Langley Air Force Base, Virginia
 August 1983 – June 1984, student, National War College, Fort Lesley J. McNair, Washington, D.C.
 June 1984 – February 1986, Special Assistant for low observable technology, Office of the Deputy Chief of Staff for Research, Development and Acquisition, Headquarters U.S. Air Force, Washington, D.C.
 February 1986 – March 1987, Commander, 56th Tactical Training Wing, MacDill Air Force Base, Florida
 March 1987 – June 1990, Assistant Deputy Chief of Staff for Operations, later, Deputy Chief of Staff for Requirements, Headquarters Tactical Air Command, Langley Air Force Base, Virginia
 June 1990 – December 1991, Director of Tactical Programs, Office of the Assistant Secretary of the Air Force for Acquisition, Washington, D.C.
 December 1991 – July 1992, Director of Operational Requirements, Office of the Deputy Chief of Staff for Plans and Operations, Headquarters U.S. Air Force, Washington, D.C.
 July 1992 – July 1994, Commander, Alaskan Command, Alaskan North American Aerospace Defense Command Region, 11th Air Force and Joint Task Force-Alaska, Elmendorf Air Force Base, Alaska
 July 1994 – June 1995, Deputy Chief of Staff for Plans and Operations, Headquarters U.S. Air Force, Washington, D.C.
 June 1995 – February 1996, Commander, Headquarters Air Combat Command, Langley Air Force Base, Virginia
 March 1996 – April 2000, Vice Chairman, Joint Chiefs of Staff, Washington, D.C.
 May 2000 – January 2003, Commander, U.S. European Command and Supreme Allied Commander Europe, NATO, Mons, Belgium

Flight information

Awards and decorations

Effective dates of promotion

Other Recognition
In 1999, Ralston received the Golden Plate Award of the American Academy of Achievement.
In 2003, Ralston received the Atlantic Council Leadership Award.

References

Notes

External links

Atlantic Council
1943 births
Living people
Joint Chiefs of Staff
United States Air Force personnel of the Vietnam War
Recipients of the Legion of Merit
Recipients of the Distinguished Flying Cross (United States)
Recipients of the Air Medal
Miami University alumni
Central Michigan University alumni
Harvard Kennedy School alumni
NATO Supreme Allied Commanders
United States Air Force generals
Vice Chairmen of the Joint Chiefs of Staff
Officiers of the Légion d'honneur
United States Army Command and General Staff College alumni
Knights Commander of the Order of Merit of the Federal Republic of Germany
Recipients of the Defense Distinguished Service Medal
Recipients of the Air Force Distinguished Service Medal
Recipients of the Military Order of the Cross of the Eagle, Class I
National War College alumni